Hugh Carson may refer to:
 Hugh Francis Carson (1926–2012), Northern Irish comedian and actor
 Hugh A. Carson (died 1913), delegate to Alabama's 1875 Constitutional Convention